Ronan Gormley (born 21 April 1983) is an Irish field hockey player. He competed for the Ireland men's national field hockey team at the 2016 Summer Olympics.

References

1983 births
Living people
Irish male field hockey players
Olympic field hockey players of Ireland
Field hockey players at the 2016 Summer Olympics
Pembroke Wanderers Hockey Club players
Men's Irish Hockey League players
Ireland international men's field hockey players